Robert Porcher (born July 30, 1969) is a former American football defensive end. He played college football for Willie Jeffries at South Carolina State University.  He played for the Detroit Lions his entire professional career. He retired before the 2004 season with 95.5 career sacks. Porcher has been involved in the Detroit community since his retirement.  He opened 3 businesses in Downtown Detroit: Detroit Breakfast House & Grill, Sweet Georgia Brown, and Seldom Blues. The Businesses filed for Chapter 11 bankruptcy in 2009.

Porcher is perhaps best recognized as a standout with the Detroit Lions. A 6-foot-3, 275-pound defensive-end, Porcher was a dominant pass-rush specialist and defensive leader.

During much of his 13-year playing career, he was one of the league's most productive and feared defensive ends. Originally a first-round draft choice in 1992 from South Carolina State University, Porcher played in 187 games (third all-time in Detroit history), and set a team record with 95.5 quarterback sacks during his career. He led Detroit in sacks eight times (also a Detroit record). He also became the first Lion to record double-digit sack totals in four consecutive seasons (1996–99).

Porcher earned trips to the Pro Bowl in 1998, 2000 and 2001. He also finished his career with 24 career games notching more than one sack. From 1996 to 2001, Porcher garnered 68 sacks during that six-year period - which was the second-highest in the NFL during that span. His 673 career tackles are ranked seventh in Detroit Lions’ history.

Off the field, Porcher became actively involved in the community. His foundation for cancer research and relief fund raised thousands of dollars for programs at the University of Michigan Comprehensive Cancer Center. The Lions annual Man of the Year award is named the "Robert Porcher Man of the Year" in honor of his tremendous contributions to the community, especially in Detroit.

Porcher is now an entrepreneur, with various business interests - most notably in the transportation industry.

NFL stats

External links
 Review of Porcher's restaurants

References

1969 births
Living people
People from Mount Pleasant, South Carolina
American football defensive ends
South Carolina State University alumni
South Carolina State Bulldogs football players
Detroit Lions players
National Conference Pro Bowl players
Players of American football from Detroit
Players of American football from South Carolina
Ed Block Courage Award recipients